The .220 Swift (5.56×56mmSR) is a semi-rimmed rifle cartridge developed by Winchester and introduced in 1935 for small game and varmint hunting.

Description
The Swift is a large-cased .224 caliber cartridge and bullet that was created for small game such as prairie dogs, groundhogs, marmots and other vermin (or "varmints" in the US). When introduced it was  faster than its nearest varmint-hunting competitor, which was the .22 Hornet (also .224 caliber). It was found to be an extremely accurate cartridge as well.

Handloaders could marginally improve on this but only at maximum loads. The Swift can be loaded with light bullets to reach . In recent times  .224" bullets have been developed for use in high velocity .22 caliber rifles for taking larger game and long-distance shooting. Heavier bullets perform best in rifles that have an appropriate rifling twist rate taking into consideration the diameter, length, and other physical properties of the projectile.

History
The prototype for the .220 Swift was developed in 1934–35 by Grosvenor Wotkyns who necked down the .250-3000 Savage as a means of achieving very high velocities. However the final commercial version developed by Winchester is based on the 6mm Lee Navy cartridge necked down, but besides inheriting headspacing on its rim from the parent, a feature already considered obsolete by 1930s, the protruding rim which complicates loading was even made larger to fit with 12mm-wide .30-06 bolt faces. The .220 Swift was developed by Winchester and introduced in 1935 as a new caliber for their Model 54 bolt-action rifle. When the Winchester Model 70 bolt action was first issued in 1936, the .220 Swift was one of the standard calibers offered and continued to be until 1964 when it was discontinued.

Acceptance
The Swift has the dubious privilege of being possibly the most controversial of all the many .224 in caliber cartridges, and has inspired equal heights of praise and criticism.  Traditionalists have roundly condemned it as an overbore "barrel burner" which can wear out a chromoly barrel in as few as 200–300 rounds, especially if long strings of shots are fired from an increasingly hot barrel.  Its supporters have maintained that the fault lies with poor-quality barrel steels and the failure of users to remove copper fouling after firing, and point to instances of rifles with fine-quality stainless steel barrels chambered for the Swift, which have maintained sub-MOA precision after well in excess of 4,000 shots. More popular, however, is the smaller and slightly lower velocity .22–250.

Drawbacks
Due to the cartridge being over capacity for the bore diameter and the extreme velocity of the projectiles, throat erosion is a common problem.  Modern metallurgy and cryogenic treatment have vastly improved barrel life with the .220 Swift and other  cartridges, although weapons firing these cartridges still usually require rechambering or rebarreling much sooner than those firing lower-velocity cartridges such as the .222 Remington and the .223 Remington.

Hunting controversy
The Swift remains a controversial deer caliber. Its use is prohibited in many US states and also in the Netherlands, England, Wales and Northern Ireland for large deer such as red, sika and fallow, but some states, such as Minnesota, currently allow smaller caliber rounds like the .220 Swift to be used. In the cartridge's early days during the 1930s, expert red deer stalkers such as W.D.M. Bell used the .220 Swift on large stags with great success, and extolled the caliber's seemingly magical killing powers, which they attributed to massive hydrostatic shock waves set up in the animal's body by the impact of the very high-velocity bullet.

Critics of the Swift have maintained that the light, bullet leaves an inadequate margin for error in bullet placement for the average deer shooter's skills, and thus invites wounding, which would have otherwise been avoidable.  There is, however, little debate about the Swift's proven effectiveness on small deer species, such as roe, provided very fast-fragmenting "varmint"-type bullets are not used.

Most factory Swift rifles come with a fairly slow twist-rate such as 1–12 or 1–14 inch, designed to stabilize the lighter bullets popular in varmint hunting. Custom Swifts can have faster twist-rates such as 1–9 inch allowing them to stabilize heavy bullets, including those with a construction suitable for larger game.

P.O. Ackley maintained that the .220 Swift was a fine round for medium-large game and used it extensively for example when culling wild burros in the American West.

Famous Alaskan wildlife control officer Frank Glaser also used a .220 Swift-chambered Winchester Model 70 extensively in the 1930's and 40's.  Glaser used the caliber on all sorts of Alaskan big game, including wolf, moose, caribou and Dall sheep, and found that as long as the shots were placed in the lungs the Swift would produce more instantaneous kills than any other gun he ever owned. However, he considered it completely inadequate for hunting grizzly bears, having to shoot an aggressive sow eleven times on one occasion.

See also
 5 mm caliber, other cartridges of 5–6 mm (.200–.236 in) caliber.p
 Delta L problem
 List of rifle cartridges
 Table of handgun and rifle cartridges
 Varmint rifle

References

220 Swift
Winchester Repeating Arms Company cartridges